Avinyonet may refer to:

Avinyonet de Puigventós, municipality in the comarca of Alt Empordà
Avinyonet del Penedès, municipality in the comarca of Alt Penedès